"Mantis Wives" is a 2012 weird fiction short story by Kij Johnson. It was first published in Clarkesworld.

Synopsis

Rather than a narrative, "Mantis Wives" is presented as various excerpts from a Kama Sutra-equivalent for a race of sapient praying mantises, where the females practice sexual cannibalism.

Reception

"Mantis Wives" was a finalist for the 2013 Hugo Award for Best Short Story. Rachel Swirsky described it as being "about the viciousness of love gone wrong". Cheryl Morgan noted that it is one of Johnson's stories of which there is "no way" that it can  "be said to be in the real world, even when they are so obviously about it". Lois Tilton called it "memorably disturbing", and asked why, if the mantis males and females were able to communicate with each other, informed consent did not play a part.

References

External links
Text of the story

Works by Kij Johnson
Works originally published in Clarkesworld Magazine